Timothy Pollard is an American former basketball player. He is best known for being a prolific three-point field goal shooter while playing for Mississippi Valley State University between 1986–87 and 1987–88. Pollard was a two-time NCAA Division I three-point field goals made per game leader in each of his two seasons playing for the Delta Devils. As a junior, he made 4.71 per game, and then as a senior he made 4.43 per game. Pollard, a  shooting guard, is a native of Clarksdale, Mississippi and played his first two seasons of college basketball at the junior college level. His 4.71 makes per game were a Division I record for juniors until Terrence Woods of Florida A&M broke it in 2003 by hitting 4.96 per game.

In one December 1986 game against Illinois, Pollard made 8 of 17 three-point attempts, all in the second half, en route to a game-high 30 points. His eight three-pointers made set a then-Assembly Hall record.

References

Living people
American men's basketball players
Basketball players from Mississippi
Coahoma Community College alumni
Junior college men's basketball players in the United States
Mississippi Valley State Delta Devils basketball players
Sportspeople from Clarksdale, Mississippi
Shooting guards
Year of birth missing (living people)